This article is about the election performance of the Bharatiya Janata Party.

Lok Sabha

Andhra Pradesh

Arunachal Pradesh

Assam

Bihar

Chhattisgarh

Delhi

Goa

Gujarat

Haryana

Himachal Pradesh

Jammu and Kashmir

Jharkhand

Karnataka

Kerala

Madhya Pradesh

Maharashtra

Manipur

Meghalaya

Mizoram

Nagaland

Odisha

Puducherry

Punjab

Rajasthan

Sikkim

Tamil Nadu

Telangana

Tripura

Uttar Pradesh

Uttarakhand

West Bengal

References

Bibliography
 
 
 
 
 
 

Election results in India
Bharatiya Janata Party
Election results by party